This is a list of schools in Gwynedd in Wales.

Primary schools
*Ysgol Abercaseg (Babanod) 
Ysgol Abersoch 
Ysgol Babanod Coedmawr 
Ysgol Babanod Morfa Nefyn 
Ysgol Baladeulyn 
Ysgol Beddgelert 
Ysgol Bethel 
Ysgol Beuno Sant 
Ysgol Bodfeurig 
Ysgol Bontnewydd 
Ysgol Brithdir 
Ysgol Bro Cynfal 
Ysgol Bro Hedd Wyn 
Ysgol Bro Lleu 
Ysgol Bro Llifon 
Ysgol Bro Plenydd 
Ysgol Bro Tegid 
Ysgol Bro Tryweryn 
Ysgol Brynaerau 
Ysgol Cae Top 
Ysgol Cefn Coch 
Ysgol Craig y Deryn 
Ysgol Crud-Y-Werin 
Ysgol Cwm Y Glo 
Ysgol Cymerau 
Ysgol Dinas Mawddwy 
Ysgol Dolbadarn 
Ysgol Edmwnd Prys 
Ysgol Eifion Wyn 
Ysgol Ein Harglwyddes 
Ysgol Felinwnda 
Ysgol Ffridd Y Llyn 
Ysgol Foel Gron 
Ysgol Friog 
Ysgol Ganllwyd 
Ysgol Glanadda 
Ysgol Glancegin 
Ysgol Gwaun Gyfni 
Ysgol Gymraeg Y Garnedd 
Ysgol Gymuned Penisarwaun 
Ysgol Gynradd Abererch 
Ysgol Gynradd Borth-Y-Gest 
Ysgol Gynradd Chwilog 
Ysgol Gynradd Dolgellau 
Ysgol Gynradd Dyffryn Ardudwy 
Ysgol Gynradd Dyffryn Dulas 
Ysgol Gynradd Edern 
Ysgol Gynradd Garndolbenmaen 
Ysgol Gynradd Llanaelhaearn 
Ysgol Gynradd Llanbedr 
Ysgol Gynradd Llanbedrog 
Ysgol Gynradd Llandwrog 
Ysgol Gynradd Llangybi 
Ysgol Gynradd Llanllyfni 
Ysgol Gynradd Llanystumdwy 
Ysgol Gynradd Maesincla 
Ysgol Gynradd Nebo 
Ysgol Gynradd Nefyn 
Ysgol Gynradd Pennal 
Ysgol Gynradd Pentreuchaf 
Ysgol Gynradd Penybryn 
Ysgol Gynradd Rhosgadfan 
Ysgol Gynradd Rhostryfan 
Ysgol Gynradd Talysarn 
Ysgol Gynradd Tanygrisiau 
Ysgol Gynradd Tudweiliog 
Ysgol Hirael 
Ysgol Ieuan Gwynedd 
Ysgol Llandygai 
Ysgol Llanelltyd 
Ysgol Llanllechid 
Ysgol Llanrug 
Ysgol Machreth 
Ysgol Maenofferen 
Ysgol Manod 
Ysgol O M Edwards 
Ysgol Penybryn 
Ysgol Pont Y Gof 
Ysgol Rhiwlas 
Ysgol Santes Helen 
Ysgol Sarn Bach 
Ysgol Talsarnau 
Ysgol Tanycastell 
Ysgol Treferthyr 
Ysgol Tregarth 
Ysgol Waunfawr 
Ysgol Y Faenol 
Ysgol Y Felinheli 
Ysgol Y Garreg 
Ysgol Y Gelli 
Ysgol Y Gorlan 
Ysgol y Traeth 
Ysgol Yr Eifl 
Ysgol Yr Hendre

Secondary schools 
Friars School
Ysgol Ardudwy 
Ysgol Botwnnog 
Ysgol Brynrefail 
Ysgol Dyffryn Nantlle 
Ysgol Dyffryn Ogwen 
Ysgol Eifionydd 
Ysgol Glan y Môr 
Ysgol Syr Hugh Owen 
Ysgol Tryfan
Ysgol Uwchradd Tywyn 
Ysgol y Berwyn 
Ysgol y Moelwyn

Independent Schools 

 St Gerards School

All-through schools 
 Ysgol Bro Idris

Special schools 
 Ysgol Hafod Lon
 Ysgol Pendalar

Further education colleges
Coleg Harlech
Coleg Meirion-Dwyfor
Coleg Menai
MPCT Bangor Farrar Road

 
Gwynedd